Brickellia cardiophylla is a Mexican species of flowering plants in the family Asteraceae. It is native to western Mexico, the states of Nayarit and Jalisco.

References

External links
Photo of herbarium specimen at Missouri Botanical Garden, collected in Jalisco, isotype of Brickellia cardiophylla

cardiophylla
Flora of Mexico
Plants described in 1901